Melognathus is a monotypic genus of southeast Asian tarantulas containing the single species, Melognathus dromeus. It was erected in 1917 for a holotype collected from a ship that visited southeast Asia. In 1985, the species was moved to Cyriopagopus because the autapomorphies were not considered significant enough to warrant a new genus. Opinions between biologists were split, some using the original name and some using Cyriopagopus. In a 2019 report, Gabriel and Sherwood pointed out that in addition to the differences in pedipalp morphology, the holotype exhibits leg features that indicate an arboreal species, while species of Cyriopagopus are largely terrestrial. The ambiguous location of the holotype has left room for speculation, but  the World Spider Catalog accepts this genus.

See also
 Cyriopagopus
 Omothymus
 List of Theraphosidae species

References

Further reading

Monotypic Theraphosidae genera
Spiders of the Philippines